Ras El Kelb is a truncated seaside cave and Paleolithic settlement located on the low-lying coast of Lebanon,  north of Beirut. It is one of the oldest habitations found in the country.

Rescue excavations were carried out in 1959 by Dorothy Garrod and G. Henri-Martin. They dug 2 trenches named the 'Rail' and 'Tunnel' trenches, from which they recovered over 30,000 flint artefacts of a wide variety for statistical analysis from 22 geological layers. It was concluded that the sea had passed the level of the cave 3 times since its first dated habitation around 50,000 years BCE (52,000 years BP).

They also discovered a tooth suggested to belong to a Neanderthal. It was suggested that the inhabitants were expert at hunting gazelle using the flints recovered.

References

Archaeological sites in Lebanon
Caves of Lebanon
Neanderthal sites